The President Is Missing may refer to:

 The President Is Missing (novel) (2018)
 The President Is Missing (video game) (1988)

See also
The President's Plane Is Missing (disambiguation)